Sir Hugh Ashley Roberts  (born 20 April 1948), is a British art historian and curator.

He was the Director of the Royal Collection, the art collection of the British Royal Family, and Surveyor of the Queen's Works of Art, whose office is responsible for the care and maintenance of the royal collection of works of art owned by the Sovereign of the United Kingdom in an official capacity.

Roberts was closely involved in the restoration of Windsor Castle, a medieval castle and royal residence located in Windsor, Berkshire, England, notable for its long association with the British Royal Family and its architecture after its 1992 fire.

Career
He was previously a director of Christie's, an art-business and a fine-arts auction house, and was the head of its Decorative Arts Department. His particular area of expertise is French and English furniture and interior decoration of the 18th and 19th centuries; he has written extensively on these subjects in Royal Collection exhibition catalogues and major journals.

On 20 April 2010, on his retirement as Director of the Royal Collection, Roberts was appointed a Knight Grand Cross of the Royal Victorian Order. and Surveyor Emeritus of The Queen's Works of Art

Personal life
Roberts  graduated from Corpus Christi College, Cambridge in 1970. On 13 December 1975, Roberts married The Hon. Jane Stephanie Low, DCVO, a daughter of the 1st Baron Aldington; they have two daughters.

Bibliography

  (alternate )

See also
List of historians

References

External links 
 Profile: Hugh Ashley Roberts Debretts

1948 births
British art historians
Directors of the Royal Collection
Alumni of Corpus Christi College, Cambridge
Fellows of Corpus Christi College, Cambridge
Fellows of the Society of Antiquaries of London
Knights Grand Cross of the Royal Victorian Order
Living people
Surveyors of the Queen's Works of Art
Writers from Portsmouth